Jim Ed Norman is an American musician, multi-platinum record producer, arranger and label-head. As an arranger and producer, he was one of the principal architects of the distinctive sound of West Coast 1970s pop and country rock. He was President of Warner Bros Records Nashville from 1984 to 2004.

Early career
Having grown up in Florida, Norman pursued music at North Texas State University where he met Don Henley and joined his group, Felicity, in 1969, playing keyboards and guitar. After renaming themselves Shiloh, and by now based in Los Angeles, the group recorded an album produced by Kenny Rogers (Amos Records, 1970) which bore early signs of the direction in which 1970s country-rock would soon move en masse. The group disbanded shortly after the release of the album.

Norman then joined Uncle Jim's Music, a group which included award-winning singer-songwriter, Gary Nicholson. Uncle Jim's Music disbanded and he made the decision to pursue his primary interest in arranging and producing.

Music and arrangement career
Norman contributed string arrangements and piano to a series of bestselling Asylum Records albums by the Eagles, released between 1973 and 1980 including Desperado (1973), One of These Nights (1975) and Hotel California (1976). During the same period, he wrote string and horn arrangements for Linda Ronstadt's album, Don't Cry Now (Asylum, 1973) and Hat Trick by America (Warner Bros, 1973). He arranged strings for Bob Seger's 1978 hit, "We've Got Tonite" (Capitol) and Kim Carnes' albums St. Vincent's Court (EMI, 1979) and Romance Dance (EMI, 1980) among others. He would continue to accrue arrangement credits throughout his career and well into its next phase in Nashville, for artists including Garth Brooks (Sevens, Capitol, 1997) and Trisha Yearwood ("In Another's Eyes", MCA, 1997).

Production career
Norman's producing career began in the mid-1970s. Among the albums he worked on, and which featured his smooth signature style, were songwriting legend Jackie DeShannon's You're The Only Dancer (Amherst, 1977) and Quick Touches (Amherst, 1978), the first of which restored DeShannon to the pop charts with the spirited anthem "Don't Let The Flame Burn Out". Other productions included albums by New Riders of the Purple Sage (Marin County Line, MCA, 1977), Glenn Frey (No Fun Aloud, Elektra, 1982), and Jennifer Warnes's first hit, "Right Time of the Night" (Arista, 1977, US #6).

From 1977 onwards, Norman produced a large portion of Anne Murray's platinum-selling output, including Let's Keep It That Way (Capitol, 1978), New Kind of Feeling (Capitol, 1979), and I'll Always Love You (Capitol, 1979). Notoriously hard-to-please critic, Robert Christgau, credited these albums with Murray's "gradual revitilazation..." thanks to Jim Ed Norman's "...clean, honest, Nashville-quality work".

The albums were platinum-selling successes, spawning multiple hit singles including the US #1 "You Needed Me", which went on to win the Grammy Award for Best Female Pop Vocal Performance, and a string of US AC chart-toppers – "I Just Fall in Love Again", "Shadows in the Moonlight", "Broken Hearted Me", and "Daydream Believer". Norman's work with Murray extended well into the 1980s during which he produced the Grammy-winning A Little Good News (Capitol, 1983) and Heart Over Mind (Capitol, 1984), both of which won CMA awards. A Little Good News marked the first time that the CMA Album of the Year award had been won by a solo female act.

While Norman had been known for providing arrangements and keyboards on albums that typified the lush, Californian sound of the seventies, as a producer his natural inclination towards country music became increasingly prominent through his work with such artists as Kenny Rogers, Hank Williams Jr., Crystal Gayle, Michael Martin Murphey, BJ Thomas, Mark O'Connor, Victoria Shaw, Mickey Gilley, Johnny Lee, John Anderson, TG Sheppard, Gary Morris, Clay Walker, Pinkard & Bowden, Mac McAnally and Brenda Lee among others. Norman was named Producer of the Year by Cashbox in 1989.

During the 1990s, Nashville became home to a migration of singer/songwriters and the city gradually became known for embracing that genre. In 1990 Norman added his production talents to this emergent trend, producing the breakthrough self-titled Warner Bros/Reprise album by singer/songwriter Beth Nielsen Chapman. He resumed duties for Nielsen Chapman's follow-up, You Hold the Key (Warner Reprise, 1993).

Time at Warner Nashville
After joining Warner Bros. Nashville as Head of A&R in 1983, Norman became President of the company in 1984. There, he was responsible for nurturing the talents of Randy Travis, Faith Hill, Blake Shelton, Travis Tritt, Dwight Yoakam, Beth Nielsen Chapman, Hank Williams Jr, Big & Rich and Michael Martin Murphey among others. His new role was also notable for the fact that it did not curtail his direct creative involvement in music, and he continued to produce and arrange.

Diversity at Warner Bros.
Norman was influential at Warner Bros. Nashville, demonstrating an inclination to increase the company's range of genres. To this end, he was involved in the successful expansion of the label's reach to include the WB Gospel and Christian division, and the launches of the Warner Western imprint, featuring Native American and Cowboy artists, and a Hispanic label – Warner Discos. In addition, Norman created the Progressive division, signing artists including multi-Grammy-winning Take 6, Bela Fleck and the Flecktones, Mark O'Connor and American guitar virtuoso Shawn Lane.

Post-Warner Bros.
Norman left Warner Bros in 2004 and relocated to Hawaii. There, he quickly became involved in music, organizing a music business program between the University of Hawaii and Belmont University, Nashville. In a short space of time, he was widely noted for his largesse, and his commitment to and support of local talent, which also benefitted Honolulu Community College, with the creation of the MELE program.

In 2010 he returned to Nashville to produce a variety of artists, notably Curb Records star, Dylan Scott, for whom he co-produced the 2016 US Country Airplay #1 hit "My Girl" and the follow-up success, "Hooked" (2017).

Norman joined Curb Records in 2012 and during his tenure served as CEO.

Awards and philanthropy

In 1990, Norman was given the Andrew Heiskell Community Service Award – a Time Warner award designed to recognise those who have contributed outstanding degrees of community service.

In 1993, he received the Anti-Defamation League Johnny Cash Americanism Award, given to recognise individuals who have fought against racism, prejudice and bigotry.

Norman was the Founding President of Leadership Music, an organisation that brings together music industry personnel, encouraging community spirit, education, the cross-pollination of ideas, and issue-based interaction. In 2019, Leadership Music celebrated its 30th anniversary. In acknowledgement of his efforts to link the Nashville community at large with the entertainment industry, Norman was given the Leadership Music Bridge Award (subsequently renamed the Dale Franklin Leadership Music Award) in 1996.

Norman was presented with the Bob Kingsley Living Legend Award February 24, 2016 on stage at the Grand Ole Opry House. The award is annually presented to someone who has made a lasting impact on the country music business. Artists present to perform and pay tribute to Norman were Big & Rich, Don Henley, Mickey Gilley, Michael Martin Murphy, TG Sheppard, Gary Morris, Crystal Gayle, Mo Pitney, Jeff Hanna, Lee Brice and Kenny Rogers. Randy Travis made an unannounced rare public appearance.

Norman was the original Fund Raising Chair and past President of the W.O. Smith Nashville Community Music School, which provides private music instruction for the children of low income families given by an all-volunteer faculty at 50 cents a lesson

The present

In 2021, Norman won a Best Roots Gospel Album Grammy for the Fisk Jubilee Singers 150th anniversary album, Celebrating Fisk! (Curb Records, 2020).

He continues to produce a wide variety of artists, most notably Dylan Scott, for whom he co-produced the #1 single "Nobody" (Curb Records, 2021) and the 2022 single, "New Truck"  (Curb Records).

He is currently on the road with the Eagles' Hotel California Tour, conducting the 50-piece orchestra and the 20-member choir, recreating his original arrangements from the iconic, multi-platinum-selling album.

Discography

Albums

References

External links
 Jim Ed Norman at AllMusic

Living people
Record producers from Florida
Record producers from Tennessee
1948 births
People from Fort Myers, Florida
People from Nashville, Tennessee
Guitarists from Florida
Guitarists from Tennessee
American male guitarists
American keyboardists
American music arrangers
American male conductors (music)
20th-century American guitarists
20th-century American pianists
American male pianists
20th-century American conductors (music)
21st-century American conductors (music)
21st-century American pianists
20th-century American male musicians
21st-century American male musicians